Wickert is a German surname. Notable people with the surname include:

Erwin Wickert (1915–2008), German diplomat
Max Wickert (born 1938), American teacher, poet, translator, and publisher
Tom Wickert, American football player
Ulrich Wickert (born 1942), German journalist

German-language surnames